Chernigovka is a rural locality (a village) in Polyakovsky Selsoviet, Davlekanovsky District, Bashkortostan, Russia. The population was 107 as of 2010. There is 1 street.

Geography 
Chernigovka is located 22 km north of Davlekanovo (the district's administrative centre) by road. Polyakovka is the nearest rural locality.

References 

Rural localities in Davlekanovsky District